Anna & Kristina's Grocery Bag was a Canadian television series that aired on the W Network and OWN Network in Canada, as well as 13 other countries around the world. Similar to the series The Shopping Bags, produced and hosted by Anna Wallner and Kristina Matisic, this series focuses on the kitchen, putting cookbooks, kitchen products, and cooking ingredients to the test.

Synopsis
Each episodes focuses on hosts Wallner and Matisic testing one cookbook.  They make several recipes, usually consisting a full meal from appetizer to dessert (except for speciality cookbooks such as a dessert cookbook) for a special guest chef (and occasionally, non-chefs) while explicitly following the book's recipes & instructions.  The meal is prepared within a strict time limit which ends when the guest chef arrives on set, and is determined by the preparation/cooking time listed in the cookbook.  At the end of the program, each host will declare the book a "Buy" or a "Pass" depending on whether they feel the book has delivered in its promise and purpose based both on the cook day experience and their individual pre-testing of the cookbook.  If both hosts give the book a "Buy", the cookbook will earn the "A&K Stamp of Approval".

Throughout each episode, Wallner & Matisic also perform product testings of several kitchen gadgets and/or food items to provide a side-by-side comparison between different brands, make or variety, similar to how they tested products on their previous show, The Shopping Bags.  These product tests usually pertain to ingredients or tools they are using in that episode.  In addition, the episodes are intertwined with interviews with the guest chefs, who share their cooking tips and tricks.

Episodes & testing results

Series overview

List of books with Stamp of Approval
Below is a complete list of cookbooks that have received the Official "A&K Stamp of Approval" by having both Wallner and Matisic give the book a Buy rating at the end of the episode.

"Three Sisters Around the Greek Table" episode
After the airing of the season 3 episode "Three Sisters Around the Greek Table" on November 10, 2010, where the book received a "Split Decision" rating with a "Buy" vote from Matisic and a "Pass" vote from Wallner, the authors of the cookbook, Betty, Eleni, and Samantha Bakopoulos posted a blog entry entitled Don't believe everything you see on T.V. – A&K stamp of what???, voicing their opinions on the results of the show.  In the entry, they claim that their cookbook was misrepresented by Wallner & Matisic due to the two's lack of cooking knowledge, expertise, and precision as several mistakes happened during the course of the program.  They also questioned the show's handling of the cooking time limit and the actual legitimacy of the "A&K Stamp of Approval".  They ultimately called the episode sensationalized for the amusement of television audiences while giving their cookbook a negative image through the omissions and errors in cooking.

On November 14, 2010, Wallner & Matisic posted a note on the show's Facebook page entitled Open Letter to the Bakopoulos Sisters (Three Sisters Around The Greek Table) explaining their reasoning behind giving the cookbook the Split Decision result which included reviews from the show's testing group panelists.  The note explained that the results were based on months of cookbook testing by multiple panelists as well as the cook day results.  It also mentioned that the cooking mistakes on the show, while included for entertainment value, did not ultimately reflect on the judging of the cookbook itself.  The omitted cooking steps were edited out post-production due to time restrictions, but not missed during the cooking process.  Wallner & Matisic noted that they posted the open letter on their Facebook page because they could not successfully post the comment on the blog entry by the cookbook authors.

The Bakopoulos sisters have since removed the original blog entry from their website.

Awards and nominations

Production and distribution
The show began broadcasting in 2008, and is filmed and produced in Vancouver, British Columbia, Canada by Worldwide Bag Media Inc., and is distributed by Picture Box Distribution. The series premiere episode, Mastering the Art of French Cooking was nominated for a 2009 Gemini Award in the category for "Best Host in a Lifestyle/Practical Information, or Performing Arts Program or Series".

In 2010, Picture Box Distribution announced that it had reached a deal with OWN: Oprah Winfrey Network which picked up the first three seasons, marking the show's debut in the United States.

Season 4 started filming in April 2012 and premiered on September 4, 2012. It was announced that show will shift from the W Network to its sister channel, Oprah Winfrey Network (Canada) starting this season.  However, a deal has yet to be reached for the American broadcast of season 4.

International Syndication

See also
The Shopping Bags
Anna & Kristina's Beauty Call

References

External links
 Anna & Kristina's Grocery Bag official website
 Anna & Kristina's Grocery Bag on Facebook
 Anna Wallner & Kristina Matisic on Twitter
 Worldwide Bag Media Inc. corporate information
 Picture Box Distribution information for the series Anna & Kristina's Grocery Bag
 Series information on OWN: Oprah Winfrey Network Canada
 Series information on OWN: Oprah Winfrey Network

Television shows filmed in Vancouver
2008 Canadian television series debuts
2013 Canadian television series endings
Food reality television series
English-language television shows
2000s Canadian cooking television series
2010s Canadian cooking television series
W Network original programming